The Rest Is Silence is a 1959 West German crime film directed by Helmut Käutner. It was entered into the 9th Berlin International Film Festival.

Cast
 Hardy Krüger - John H. Claudius
 Peter van Eyck - Paul Claudius
 Ingrid Andree - Fee von Pohl
 Adelheid Seeck - Gertrud Claudius
 Rudolf Forster - Dr. von Pohl
 Boy Gobert - Mike R. Krantz
 Rainer Penkert - Major Horace
 Heinz Drache - Herbert von Pohl
 Charles Régnier - Inspector Fortner
 Siegfried Schürenberg - Johannes Claudius
 Richard Allan - Stanley Goulden
 Josef Sieber - Werks-Pförtner
 Robert Meyn - Dr. Voltman
 Erwin Linder - Direktor
 Werner Schumacher - Werks-Fahrer

References

External links

1959 films
1959 crime films
German crime films
West German films
1950s German-language films
Films directed by Helmut Käutner
German black-and-white films
Films about families
1950s business films
Films based on Hamlet
1950s German films